Petra Krejsová and Tereza Smitková were the defending champions, but Krejsová chose to participate at the 2015 Hardee's Pro Classic whilst Smitková chose not to participate.

The top seeds Lyudmyla Kichenok and Nadiia Kichenok won the title, defeating Russian-duo Valentyna Ivakhnenko and Polina Monova in the final, 6–4, 6–3.

Seeds

Draw

References 
 Draw

Lale Cup - Doubles
Lale Cup